Sepedon sphegea is a Palearctic  species of fly in the family Sciomyzidae, the marsh flies or snail-killing flies. The larva feeds on aquatic snails and as an opportunist on other invertebrates. 
The habitat of this species includes among many others, pond margins and damp meadows. It has a particular fondness for Iris pseudacorus which grow at the edges of the pond. Adults can be found all year long but the main flight period is from March to October.

References

External links
Ecology of Commanster

Sciomyzidae
Insects described in 1775
Articles containing video clips
Diptera of Europe
Taxa named by Johan Christian Fabricius